is a railway station in the city of Nagano, Nagano Prefecture, Japan.

Lines
Kawanakajima Station is served by the Shin'etsu Main Line and is 4.3 kilometers from the terminus of the line at Shinonoi Station. The station is also a freight terminal for the Japan Freight Railway Company (JR Freight).

Station layout
The station consists of one ground-level island platform serving two tracks, connected to the station building by a footbridge. The station has a Midori no Madoguchi staffed ticket office.

Platforms

History
Kawanakajima Station opened on 20 July 1917. With the privatization of Japanese National Railways (JNR) on 1 April 1987, the station came under the control of JR East.

Passenger statistics
In fiscal 2015, the station was used by an average of 1,585 passengers daily (boarding passengers only).

Surrounding area
 site of the Battle of Kawanakajima

See also
List of railway stations in Japan

References

External links
Kawanakajima Station (JR East) 

Stations of East Japan Railway Company
Japan Freight Railway Company
Railway stations in Japan opened in 1917
Railway stations in Nagano (city)
Shin'etsu Main Line
Shinonoi Line
Shinano Railway Line